Labid in Iran may refer to:
 Labid, Isfahan